Manikya Lal Verma (Born on 4 December 1897 in a Mathur kayastha family) was a member of Constituent Assembly of India in 1949. He was prime minister of Rajasthan, India before full formation of the state. He was elected to Lok Sabha in 1957 from Chittorgarh and in 1952 from Tonk. He was recipient of Padma Bhushan in 1965.

He played pivotal role in Bijolia movement, a farmers agitation raised between 1919 and 1923 in Bhilwara. He remained in prison for several years being a freedom fighter.  Verma was an untiring social activist. He played a vital role in promoting education among Tribes, other backward classes and women in southern Rajasthan.  He founded Vimukt Janjaati sangh to promote social conditions of notified castes. This organisation established several hostels for notified caste students in Rajasthan. In Western border district's Simant (सीमान्त) Chatrawas were established on his initiative.

He died on 14 January 1969. His wife Smt. Narayni Devi was a member of Rajya Sabha and son Deen Bandhu Verma was a member of Loksabha from Udaipur constituency. His son in law Shiv Charan Mathur was also Chief Minister of Rajasthan for two terms.

The Manikya Lal Verma Textile and Engineering College was named after him. A huge garden at bank of Pichola lake, Udaipur is also named behind him.

Other details as per loksabha.nic.in ...

Social and Political worker; Secretary, Vidya Pracharini Sabha, Bijolia (1916); Organised Peasant Satyagraha against taxes and forced labour in 1918; Imprisoned in 1919, also 1923, thrice in 1927 and again in 1931; Interned at Kumbhalgarh in 1932-33 and expelled from Udaipur State in 1938 for establishing 'Praja Mandal' and conducting Satyagraha against the State and imprisoned again for one year, 1939; Participated in 'Quit India Movement'; Chairman of Reception Committee, All India States' People's Conference, 1945; Chief Minister of Rajasthan, 1948–49; President, Rajasthan State Congress Committee, 1951; Member, All India Congress Working Committee, 1952–54; President, Rajasthan Bhil Seva Mandal Vimukta Jati Sevak Sangh, 1954–55; Convener, All India Gadia Luhar Sammelan and Bharat Sevak Samaj, 1955–56; President, Gadiya Lohar Sewak Sangh, 1956–62, Rajasthan Adim Jati Sevak Sangh, 1957–62; Rajasthan Van Shramik Sahakari Sangh, 1959–62; Member, Constituent Assembly, 1947–50; Provisional Parliament, 1950–52; First Lok Sabha, 1952—57 and Second Lok Sabha, 1957–62.

Social activities:  Organised Harijan Ashram at Nareli in Ajmer Merwara, 1934; Did constructive work among Bhils and Meenas of Rajasthan at Village Khadlai, Dungarpur State in August, 1934; Established Akal Pidit Seva Sangh, Mewar, 1940; Established Harijan Sevak Sangh and Bhil Seva Sangh in Udaipur; Established Mahila Ashram, Bhilwara, 1944; Established Rajasthan Kalbeliya Seva Sangh.

Special interests:  Improvement of agriculture on modern lines; Establishment of Socialistic Society on the cooperative principles; Established three Tribes colony in Udaipur and Kota District and settled Gadia Lohars in Jodhpur, Nagor, Bikaner, Ajmer, Pali District and Banjaras in Bhilwara District, Kalbeliyas in Udaipur District.

References

External links 
 
 
 
 Reference to the "late Manikya Lal Verma"

Recipients of the Padma Bhushan in social work
Indian independence activists from Rajasthan
Members of the Constituent Assembly of India
Rajasthani politicians
Rajasthani people
Educators from Rajasthan
India MPs 1952–1957
1880s births
1969 deaths
India MPs 1957–1962
India MPs 1962–1967
Lok Sabha members from Rajasthan
20th-century Indian educators
Social workers
Prisoners and detainees of British India
People from Tonk district
Social workers from Rajasthan